The Todd Corporation is a large private New Zealand company with a value of $4.3 billion, owned and controlled by the Todd family and headquartered in Wellington, New Zealand. The corporation is currently led by chairman of the board, Henry Tait, and Group Chief Executive Officer, Jon Young. The corporation employs 800 individuals, at 20 locations in New Zealand, Australia and the United States, including eight on the senior management team. The board of directors has nine members.

History
The history of Todd Corporation is understood to have begun in 1885, when Scottish immigrant Charles Todd founded and opened either a wool scouring business (according to Todd Energy) or a rural goods store in Central Otago. By 1929, it had evolved into a car sales and maintenance business run by his son and namesake Charles Todd after the company began importing motor vehicles.

This automotive business would define the Todd family business until well into the 1980s. Charles Todd was credited with bringing the first motor car into Otago and in 1908 acquired a Ford dealership in Dunedin then in 1928 acquired the Rootes Group franchise for Hillman, Humber and Commer and obtained an Auckland branch.

During the protectionist years of the 1930s the Todd family formed Todd Motor Industries Limited and in 1934 built an automotive assembly plant in Petone to reassemble vehicles imported as parts from Chrysler (USA) and Rootes. According to the Todd Energy website by 1964, Todd Motors was assembling and selling over 10,000 cars per year. In 1970 the company purchased the New Zealand Mitsubishi franchise. This franchise and assembly plants were sold to Mitsubishi Motors in 1987.

The Todd family also founded Europa, an oil importing and retail business that owned terminal services at four major ports and a chain of petrol stations across New Zealand. According to the Todd Energy website, this business was founded during disruptions in the petrol industry in 1929. Europa was originally named 'Associated Motorists Petrol Company Limited' (AMPC) and was formed in 1931. The company imported petrol from the Soviet Union from 1933, and was supported by the New Zealand Farmers' Union and various regional Automobile Associations. Because of price under-cutting by overseas oil companies, the government introduced price regulation of petrol from 1933. According to Todd Energy, Europa was the first to offer electric petrol pumps in New Zealand, the first to use articulated road tankers for fuel distribution and the first chain to operate service station convenience stores.

The Todd family also developed interests in the prospecting for, extraction of and refining of petroleum products. In 1954 they acquired prospecting licenses around New Zealand and developed joint venture agreements with Shell Oil New Zealand Limited and BP New Zealand. The discovery of the Kapuni gas and condensate field in 1959 meant that the Todd family together with Shell and BP became major players in the New Zealand petroleum production business.

Later discoveries in the Maui gas field meant the Todd family was intimately involved in supplying a majority of New Zealand's LPG and CNG natural gas for energy generation as well as fuel for the transport industry. Together with Shell, BP and the Government-owned Petrocorp began production in 1980.

In 1972 BP New Zealand took a 60 percent interest in Europa, purchasing the company's marketing and refining interests including the Europa petrol stations. The two retail brands continued to operate independently, however in 1989 they were brought under the BP brand.

Todd continued its involvement in the exploration and production businesses.

When sold to Mitsubishi in 1987, Todd Motors was assembling a wide range of cars, and light and heavy commercial vehicles. During the 1980s the Company held the number two market share position in the New Zealand automobile industry. The sale brought the Todd family's involvement in the New Zealand automotive industry to a close.

Investments
The Todd Corporation has interests in oil and gas exploration and production, electricity generation, property development, healthcare, minerals, technology.
 Integria Healthcare
 PartsTrader Markets
 Todd Energy
 Todd Minerals
 Todd Property

Previous investments
 A 35.0% shareholding in Metlifecare Limited, Todd Capital sold its entire shareholding in November 2005.
 A 14.2% shareholding in Independent Newspapers Limited (INL)
 A 25.0% shareholding in Clear Communications
 A 20.0% shareholding in AAPT Limited,
 A 21.0% shareholding in UtiliCorp NZ Inc
 An interest in Sky Network Television a pay television operator
 A 54% shareholding in King Country Energy Ltd.

Todd Energy

Todd Energy is a diversified energy subsidiary based in New Zealand. Company offices are in Wellington, New Plymouth, Perth and Calgary.

Todd Energy has interests in several producing fields in New Zealand, including Maui (6.25%), Kapuni (50%), McKee (100%), Mangahewa (100%), Maari (16%) and Pohokura (26%). Todd also has interests in 10 exploration permits, 5 of which are operated.

Todd has a 50% stake in Shell Todd Oil Services. Retail brands include Auckland Gas.

History 
Todd Energy traces its roots back to 1929 as the first indigenous oil company in New Zealand. The first Todd-owned commercial venture in New Zealand however was a fellmongery opened at Heriot in West Otago in 1885.  The fellmongery was soon accompanied by a wool scouring business set up to support the growing sheep farming industry in the lower South Island.

The Todd Group's first foray into the motor industry was by obtaining the ford dealership in Otago in the very early part of last century. This eventually led to the them entering the petroleum industry, as a petroleum price war in1929  cut off supplies to their Christchurch branch of a Todd motor dealership. This was the catalyst for forming the Associated Motorists Petrol Company Limited, an indigenous petroleum marketing company.

Nova Energy

Nova Energy is a subsidiary that generates electricity and retails electricity, natural gas and broadband in New Zealand. They supply energy to both the residential and commercial sector with customers ranging from private homes, schools, and hospitals to large industries. It is New Zealand operated, with its customer service teams based in New Zealand.

History 
KCE sought to develop a 9.6 MW hydroelectric power station on the Mokau River, approximately 4.3 km downstream from the Wairere Falls dam. In 2006, application to Environment Waikato for resource consents was declined.
Nova Energy has been granted resource consents to construct a 100MW gas fired peaking plant about 7 km south of New Plymouth and, in 2017, a 360MW mid-merit gas fired power station near the Waipā River, at 869 Kawhia Rd, Ōtorohanga. Bay of Plenty Energy was a wholly owned subsidiary that changed its name to Nova Energy, the national brand, in 2012. Crest Energy is the developer of the Kaipara Tidal Power Station.

Power stations 
Their power generation assets include geothermal, gas fired cogeneration, and solar plants.

References

External links
 Todd Energy
 Nova Energy

 
Electric power companies of New Zealand
Companies based in Wellington
Oil and gas companies of New Zealand
New Zealand companies established in 1884
Energy companies established in 1884